Colonel Peter Bonnevaux (1752–1797) was the fourth Military Governor of British Ceylon and third General Officer Commanding, Ceylon. He was appointed Governor on 2 July 1797 and was Governor until 12 July 1797. He was succeeded by Pierre Frédéric de Meuron.

Bonnevaux joined the 10th Madras Native Infantry of the East India Company's Madras Army as an Ensign in 1768 and rose to the rank of Lieutenant Colonel by 1794.

References

Governors of British Ceylon
British expatriates in Sri Lanka
19th-century British people
General Officers Commanding, Ceylon
1797 deaths
1752 births
British East India Company Army officers